The Prosperous Peace Party was a Christian-democratic political party in Indonesia. It portrayed itself as the reincarnation of Parkindo, the Indonesian Christian Party, which contested the 1955 and 1971 elections. Although it was initially founded by Christians, the party was open to all religions, and 21 of its candidates in the 2009 legislative election were Muslim.

In the 2004 Indonesian legislative election, the party won 2.1% of the popular vote and 12 out of 550 seats, but in the 2009 legislative election, the party won 1.5 percent of the votes, less than the required 2.5 percent electoral threshold, meaning it lost all its seats in the People's Representative Council.

The party agreed to merge along with 9 other parties into Hanura on 10 March 2013 after failing to be certified to contest in the 2014 legislative election by the Electoral Commission.

References

External links
PDS official website

Pancasila political parties
Political parties in Indonesia
Christian political parties
2001 establishments in Indonesia
2013 disestablishments in Indonesia